Tojikiston is a jamoat in Tajikistan. It is located in Baljuvon District in Khatlon Region. The jamoat has a total population of 5,474 (2015).

References

Populated places in Khatlon Region
Jamoats of Tajikistan